Monte Muambe is an inactive volcano located east of Moatize in the Tete Province of  Mozambique.
The volcano is 780 meters high, has a 6 km external diameter with a caldera some 200m deep. The caldera is largely composed of carbonatites, rich in both blue and yellow fluorite.  The Zambezi Valley Spatial Development Initiative estimates Monte Muambe has reserves of 1.1 trillion tonnes of the mineral in a pure form.

External links 
 Ministry of Mineral Resources and Energy Moçambique

References 

Calderas of Africa
Inactive volcanoes
Mountains of Mozambique
Volcanoes of Mozambique
Carbonatite occurrences